The 2016 American Samoa gubernatorial election was held on November 8, 2016, coinciding with the 2016 United States presidential elections and other US elections.

The incumbent, Governor Lolo Matalasi Moliga sought re-election. Moliga won re-election, defeating Faoa Aitofele Sunia, 60.2% to 35.8%, while Tuika Tuika received 4.0% of the vote.

All American Samoan elections are officially nonpartisan, although both Lolo Matalasi Moliga and Faoa Aitofele Sunia affiliate themselves with the Democratic Party and Tuika Tuika affiliates with the Republican Party.

Candidates
 Lolo Matalasi Moliga, incumbent governor, affiliated with the Democratic Party 
Running mate: Lemanu Peleti Mauga, incumbent Lieutenant Governor

 Faoa Aitofele Sunia, former lieutenant governor, affiliated with the Democratic Party 
Running mate: Larry Sanitoa, Territorial Representative

 Tuika Tuika, accountant and candidate for governor in 2008, affiliated with the Republican Party 
Running mate: Iuni Maeva, veteran

Results

References

Gubernatorial election
2016
American Samoa
2016 in American Samoa
Non-partisan elections
November 2016 events in Oceania